KPAX-TV (channel 8) is a television station in Missoula, Montana, United States, affiliated with CBS and The CW Plus. Owned by the E. W. Scripps Company, it is part of the Montana Television Network, a statewide network of CBS-affiliated stations. KPAX-TV's studios are located on West Central Avenue in Missoula, and its transmitter is located on TV Mountain north of the city.

KAJJ-CD (channel 18) in Kalispell operates as a low-power, Class A semi-satellite of KPAX-TV; known on-air as KAJ, it broadcasts the same schedule as KPAX, but with local commercials and news segments. To comply with the requirements of its Class A license, KAJJ also produces its own weeknight 5:30 and 10 p.m. newscasts with a separate anchor, which premiered in 2010.

History
The signal of KXLF-TV in Butte had been received in Missoula since 1958, when a translator was set up in the Rattlesnake Valley, but KXLF-TV itself was approved to set up a translator station in Missoula in December 1965, at the same time that KMSO-TV of Missoula was allowed to build a translator in Butte, which began broadcasting in February 1966.

Joe Sample, owner of KXLF-TV, applied to build a full-power satellite of the station for Missoula on October 15, 1969 through subsidiary Garryowen Butte TV. The Federal Communications Commission (FCC) granted the construction permit on December 23. KPAX-TV went on the air in two phases: provisionally from a  tower on May 9, 1970, and from its full, 257,000-watt facility on June 5.

In January 1977, a former television and appliance store on Regent Street was remodeled into a local studio for KPAX. This allowed KPAX to sever the electronic umbilical cord with KXLF and begin the production of local news and commercials in the city. The year before, KXLF-KPAX had become a primary ABC affiliate, with CBS being shared with KGVO-TV/KTVM-TV in the Missoula and Butte areas.

In 1984, Sample sold the MTN stations to SJL, Inc. for $20 million. The network became exclusively affiliated with CBS that year; as a result, the airing of ABC programs in Missoula and Butte moved to the Eagle Communications network (KECI, KTVM, and KCFW), which signed an affiliation agreement with the network to air it alongside NBC.

MTN was split two years later when the stations outside Billings, including KPAX-TV, were sold to Evening Post Publishing Company, through its Cordillera Communications subsidiary, for $24 million in 1986. The hybrid local-state news format that had been used at MTN since 1971 was abolished, with each station beginning to produce full-length local newscasts. 

While MTN was changing owners, a low-power TV station was going on the air at Kalispell. Owned by Thom Curtis and Daniel Coon of Billings, stockholders in KOUS-TV in Hardin, K18AJ made its debut on July 10, 1985, and primarily aired programming from the Satellite Program Network. It went silent in mid-1988 and was sold to KPAX-TV, returning to the air in November as a translator with local commercials. In addition, a news reporter was stationed full-time in the Kalispell area; separate evening newscasts have been produced since 2000 for Kalispell. The call sign was altered to KAJJ-CA in 2011 and KAJJ-CD in 2012.

KECI-TV with KCFW in Kalispell generally had the lead in local news in the Missoula market until KPAX-TV surpassed it in 1993, aided by the defection of anchor Jill Valley from KECI. The station began producing a local morning newscast in 1996.

Notable former on-air staff
 Christine Clayburg – meteorologist

Technical information

Subchannels
The station's digital signal is multiplexed:

Translators

Analog-to-digital conversion
KPAX-TV shut down its analog signal, over VHF channel 8, on June 12, 2009, the official date in which full-power television stations in the United States transitioned from analog to digital broadcasts under federal mandate. The station's digital signal remained on its pre-transition VHF channel 7. Through the use of PSIP, digital television receivers display the station's virtual channel as its former VHF analog channel 8.

References

External links
Official KPAX-TV website
Official KAJJ-CD website
CW 8.2

Montana Television Network
CBS network affiliates
The CW affiliates
Grit (TV network) affiliates
Ion Television affiliates
Court TV affiliates
Television channels and stations established in 1970
PAX-TV
1970 establishments in Montana
E. W. Scripps Company television stations